Rajmani Patel is an Indian politician from the Indian National Congress who was elected to the Rajya Sabha from Madhya Pradesh on 15 March 2018.

Early life
Born in a village called Barron (Bairon) in Rewa district of Madhya Pradesh to Jamuna Prasad Patel.

Career
He was the treasurer of Advocates Association in 1965. He worked against feudalism and subsequently went to jail.

Politics
Very active during 1978–79 in Congress agitations, he was first elected to the Madhya Pradesh Legislative Assembly in the year 1972 from Sirmour and subsequently in 1980, 1985 and 1998.

He also served as Working President of MP Congress.

References

External links
Rajmani Patel on Twitter
Rajmani Patel on Facebook

Living people
Rajya Sabha members from Madhya Pradesh
1945 births
Indian National Congress politicians from Madhya Pradesh